Caerphilly District Miners’ Hospital was a community hospital in Caerphilly, Wales. It was managed by the Aneurin Bevan University Health Board.

History
The hospital was established in a private house known as "The Beeches" which was acquired from Frederick Piggott, a mining contractor. It was commissioned to provide healthcare to the miners, who worked in the local pits, and their families. The hospital received its first patient on 2 July 1923. In the 1940s the hospital broadened its services to the whole community rather than just miners and their families. In 1945 the Hospital Board acquired Redbrook House, another large property, and converted it into a nurses' home. The hospital joined the National Health Service in 1948.

After services transferred to Ysbyty Ystrad Fawr at Ystrad Mynach, Caerphilly District Miners Hospital closed in November 2011. The site was subsequently redeveloped for housing and the main hospital building converted into a community centre.

References

Hospital buildings completed in 1923
Defunct hospitals in Wales
Hospitals established in 1923
Hospitals disestablished in 2011
1923 establishments in Wales
Hospitals in Caerphilly County Borough